Boletina trispinosa is a Palearctic species of  'fungus gnat' in the family Mycetophilidae. Members of this genus are found in a wider variety of habitats from wooded streams to wetlands and open moorland. They make use of diverse breeding sites from the more normal habitat of rotting wood to mosses and liverworts. The breeding biology of most species is largely unknown.

References

External links
 Images representing  Boletina trispinosa at BOLD

Mycetophilidae